The Norway Rugby Championship (Norwegian: Norgesmesterskap)  is the highest tier of domestic club rugby union competition in Norway. It is operated by the Norwegian Rugby Union (Norges Rugbyforbund)

History
The competition was first contested in 1994.

Current clubs

Format
Six teams take part and each team plays six matches (one match against each team and the finals day) which then leads to play-offs and a final and placing matches. The season runs from May through October of the same year.

Final results

References

National rugby union premier leagues
Rugby union in Norway
Norway
rugby union
1994 establishments in Norway
Sports leagues established in 1994